Saint Mary Goreti Secondary School is a Catholic secondary school, located near Moshi town, in the Kilimanjaro Region of Tanzania.

Female gender form about 97% of the students while the remaining are male population. The school is a property of the Catholic Church as are many institutions in the country and run by religious sisters. Its core goal is to create a better future for women in African society.

Academics
The school offers both O-level and A-level education.

See also

 Education in Tanzania
 List of schools in Tanzania

References 

1999 establishments in Tanzania
Buildings and structures in the Kilimanjaro Region
Educational institutions established in 1999

Catholic secondary schools in Tanzania